Josh Tynan (born 6 November 1993) is a former professional Australian rules football player who played for the Melbourne Football Club in the Australian Football League (AFL). He was recruited in the 2011 National Draft, with pick #52.

References

External links

1993 births
Living people
Melbourne Football Club players
Australian rules footballers from Victoria (Australia)
Gippsland Power players
Casey Demons players
Frankston Football Club players